Edwin Frank "Win" Young (September 29, 1947June 22, 2006) was an American diver. He represented the United States at the 1968 Summer Olympics in Mexico City, where he won a bronze medal in 10 m platform.

Young was a six-time All-American diver for Indiana University and won the gold medal in 10 m platform at the 1967 Pan American Games. In retirement he coached diving at the University of Arizona.

Young died in 2006, aged 58. He was survived by his daughter, Heather Marie Burgoyne.

References

1947 births
2006 deaths
American male divers
Divers at the 1968 Summer Olympics
Olympic bronze medalists for the United States in diving
Medalists at the 1968 Summer Olympics
Pan American Games medalists in diving
Pan American Games gold medalists for the United States
Sportspeople from Phoenix, Arizona
Divers at the 1967 Pan American Games
Medalists at the 1967 Pan American Games